Wanda Grabińska (1902-1980), was a Polish lawyer and judge. She was the first judge of her gender in Poland.

She graduated in law in 1924. In 1927, she applied for the position of judge on the basis that the Polish constitution recognized equal rights for the sexes to all public positions. Her application was approved and she was named judge 6 March 1929. She thereby became the first woman in that position in Poland. In 1929, she was one of the founders of the Lawyer's association. She was later engaged at the social insurance bureau.

References

 Wanda Grabińska (pol.). W: Baza osób polskich

1902 births
1980 deaths
20th-century Polish journalists
Polish women lawyers
People of the Second Polish Republic
University of Warsaw alumni